Tomoplagia is a genus of tephritid  or fruit flies in the family Tephritidae.

Species
T. aberrans Aczél, 1954
T. achromoptera Prado, Norrbom & Lewinsohn, 2004
T. aczeli Prado, Norrbom & Lewinsohn, 2004
T. argentiniensis Aczél, 1955
T. arsinoe Hering, 1942
T. atelesta Hendel, 1914
T. atimeta Hendel, 1914
T. bicolor Prado, Norrbom & Lewinsohn, 2004
T. biseriata (Loew, 1873)
T. brasiliensis Prado, Norrbom & Lewinsohn, 2004
T. brevipalpis Aczél, 1955
T. carrerai Aczél, 1955
T. cipoensis Prado, Norrbom & Lewinsohn, 2004
T. conjuncta Hendel, 1914
T. costalimai Aczél, 1955
T. cressoni Aczél, 1955
T. deflorata Hering, 1937
T. dejeanii (Robineau-Desvoidy, 1830)
T. diagramma Hendel, 1914
T. dimorphica Prado, Norrbom & Lewinsohn, 2004
T. discolor (Loew, 1862)
T. fiebrigi Hendel, 1914
T. formosa Aczél, 1955
T. grandis Prado, Norrbom & Lewinsohn, 2004
T. heringi Aczél, 1955
T. incompleta (Williston, 1896)
T. interrupta Prado, Norrbom & Lewinsohn, 2004
T. jonasi (Lutz & Lima, 1918)
T. kelloggi Aczél, 1955
T. matzenbacheri Prado, Norrbom & Lewinsohn, 2004
T. minattai Aczél, 1955
T. minuta Hering, 1938
T. monostigma Hendel, 1914
T. obliqua (Say, 1830)
T. ovalipalpis Aczél, 1955
T. pallens Abreu, Prado, Norrbom & Solfrerini, 2005
T. penicillata Hendel, 1914
T. phaedra Hendel, 1914
T. pleuralis Hendel, 1914
T. propleuralis Aczél, 1955
T. pseudopenicillata Aczél, 1955
T. punctata Aczél, 1955
T. pura (Curran, 1931)
T. quadriseriata Hendel, 1914
T. quadrivittata Lima, 1934
T. quinquefasciata (Macquart, 1835)
T. reimoseri Hendel, 1914
T. reticulata Abreu, Prado, Norrbom & Solfrerini, 2005
T. rudolphi (Lutz & Lima, 1918)
T. rupestris Prado, Norrbom & Lewinsohn, 2004
T. salesopolitana Aczél, 1955
T. separata Hendel, 1914
T. stacta Hendel, 1914
T. stonei Aczél, 1955
T. titschacki Hering, 1941
T. tripunctata Hendel, 1914
T. trivittata (Lutz & Lima, 1918)
T. unifascia Hendel, 1914
T. variabilis Prado, Norrbom & Lewinsohn, 2004
T. vernoniae Hering, 1938
T. voluta Prado, Norrbom & Lewinsohn, 2004

References

Tephritinae
Tephritidae genera
Taxa named by Daniel William Coquillett
Diptera of South America
Diptera of North America